The 20th National Congress of the People's Party, officially the 20th Extraordinary National Congress, was held in Seville from 1 to 2 April 2022, to renovate the leading bodies of the People's Party (PP) and establish the party's main lines of action and strategy for the next leadership term. A primary election to elect the new party president was held on 21 March. The congress was called following the forced ousting of both Pablo Casado as president and Teodoro García Egea as secretary-general in the aftermath of a major crisis that ravaged the party from 16 to 23 February. Galician president Alberto Núñez Feijóo became the party's new president.

Following her landslide victory in the 4 May 2021 regional election, Madrilenian president Isabel Díaz Ayuso came to be increasingly seen by some within the party as a better leader than Casado to face off Prime Minister Pedro Sánchez in the next Spanish general election. A conflict started from September 2021 onwards when Ayuso rushed for the control of the party's regional branch in the Community of Madrid, with such a move being seen by Casado's supporters as an immediate threat to his national leadership. Following several months of a poor and erratic leadership on Casado's behalf and a disappointing party result in the self-imposed 2022 Castilian-Leonese regional election, the crisis entered a new stage on 16 February 2022 when some media revealed an alleged plot of García Egea's allies to investigate Ayuso's family in search of compromising material—more specifically, alleged influence peddling in the awarding of public contracts to Ayuso's brother. After several days of public infighting between both Casado and Ayuso, Feijóo was reported as having agreed with the latter and other party regional presidents to become the party's new leader and replace Casado, whose incoming resignation and that of García Egea were announced on 22 February after they were publicly abandoned by most of their party's colleagues.

The congress slogan was "Lo haremos bien". On 18 March 2022, it was announced that 41,681 PP members had registered to vote in the primary election scheduled for 21 March.

Overview
The congress of the PP is the party's supreme body, and can be of either ordinary or extraordinary nature, depending on whether it is held following the natural end of its term or due to any other exceptional circumstances not linked to this event. Ordinary congresses are to be held every four years and called at least two months in advance of their celebration, though this timetable can be altered for up to twelve months in the event of coincidence with electoral processes. Extraordinary congresses have to be called by a two-thirds majority of the Board of Directors at least one-and-a-half month in advance of their celebration, though in cases of "exceptional urgency" this deadline can be reduced to thirty days.

The president of the PP is the party's head and the person holding the party's political and legal representation, and presides over its board of directors and executive committee, which are the party's maximum directive, governing and administration bodies between congresses.

Electoral system
The election of the PP president is based on a two-round system. Any party member with at least one-year membership is eligible for the post of party president, on the condition that they are up to date with the payment of party fees and that they are able to secure the signed endorsements of at least 100 party members. The election is to be held in the party's 60 constituencies, corresponding to each province and island of Spain.

In the first round, all registered party members who have their payment fees up to date are allowed to vote for any of the candidates who have been officially proclaimed by virtue of securing the required number of signatures to run. In the event that no candidate wins the first round outright—which requires securing at least 50 percent of the national vote, being the most voted candidate in at least half of the constituencies and at least a 15-percentage point advantage over the runner-up—a second round will be held concurrently with the party congress, in which party delegates will elect the new party leader from among the two candidates who have previously received the most votes in the first round. Most of the delegates are to be elected by party members concurrently with the first round of voting to the party leadership.

Timetable
The key dates are listed below (all times are CET. Note that the Canary Islands use WET (UTC+0) instead):

1 March: Official announcement of the congress. Start of application period for party members to register in order to participate in the leadership election.
8 March: Start of candidate submission period at 12 am.
9 March: End of candidate submission period at 8 pm.
10 March: Proclamation of candidates to the party presidency.
11 March: Official start of internal electoral campaigning.
16 March: Deadline for party members to register for voting at 2 pm.
16 March: Deadline for party members to apply as delegates at 2 pm.
20 March: Last day of internal electoral campaigning.
21 March: Primary election (first round of voting, with all registered party members entitled to vote for the proclaimed candidates) and election of congress delegates.
1−2 April: Party congress (if needed, a run-off voting was to be held among delegates to elect the party leader among the two most voted candidates in the first round).

Candidates

Declined
The individuals in this section were the subject of speculation about their possible candidacy, but publicly denied or recanted interest in running:

Cayetana Álvarez de Toledo (age ) — Deputy in the Cortes Generales for Barcelona and Madrid (2008–2015 and since 2019); Spokesperson of the PP Group in the Congress of Deputies (2019–2020).
Pablo Casado (age ) — Deputy in the Cortes Generales for Ávila and Madrid (since 2011); President of the PP (2018–2022); Leader of the Opposition of Spain (2018–2022); Vice Secretary-General of Communication of the PP (2015–2018); President of NNGG in the Community of Madrid (2005–2013); Deputy in the Assembly of Madrid (2007–2009).
Isabel Díaz Ayuso (age ) — President of the Community of Madrid (since 2019); Spokesperson of the PP Group in the Assembly of Madrid (2019); Deputy Minister of the Presidency and Justice of the Community of Madrid (2017–2018); Deputy in the Assembly of Madrid (2011–2017 and since 2019).
José Luis Martínez-Almeida (age ) — Mayor of Madrid (since 2019); City Councillor of Madrid (since 2015); National Spokesperson of the PP (2020–2022); Spokesperson of the PP Group in the City Council of Madrid (2017–2019); Director-General of Artistic Heritage of the Community of Madrid (2007–2011).
Juan Manuel Moreno (age ) — President of the Regional Government of Andalusia (since 2019); Deputy in the Parliament of Andalusia for Málaga (1996–2000 and since 2015); President of the PP of Andalusia (since 2014); Senator in the Cortes Generales appointed by the Parliament of Andalusia (2014–2017); Secretary of State of Social Services and Equality (2011–2014); Coordinator of Regional and Local Policy of the PP (2008–2012); Deputy in the Cortes Generales for Cantabria and Málaga (2000–2004 and 2007–2011); President of NNGG (1997–2001); City Councillor of Málaga (1995–1997).

Endorsements
Candidates seeking to run were required to collect the endorsements of at least 100 party members.

Opinion polls
Poll results are listed in the tables below in reverse chronological order, showing the most recent first, and using the date the survey's fieldwork was done, as opposed to the date of publication. If such date is unknown, the date of publication is given instead. The highest percentage figure in each polling survey is displayed in bold, and the background shaded in the candidate's colour. In the instance of a tie, the figures with the highest percentages are shaded. Polls show data gathered among PP voters/supporters as well as Spanish voters as a whole, but not among party members, who are the ones ultimately entitled to vote in the primary election.

PP voters

Spanish voters

Results

Notes

References
Opinion poll sources

Other

Political party leadership elections in Spain
2022 political party leadership elections